Thomas Arquis Howard (July 14, 1983 – November 18, 2013) was an American football linebacker in the National Football League. He was drafted by the Oakland Raiders in the second round of the 2006 NFL Draft. He also played for the Cincinnati Bengals and Atlanta Falcons. He played college football for the University of Texas at El Paso.

College career
Thomas A. Howard began his college career as a walk-on at the University of Texas at El Paso and was then redshirted. He had a solid freshman season, being named to Sporting News All-WAC Freshman team. He played in 11 games and made 4 starts at weakside linebacker. The following season, he played in 13 games and started 10 of them. He had a great junior season being named Second Team All-WAC and helping lead his team to their first bowl game since 2001. He had a mediocre senior season after being named pre-season defensive player of the year in the state of Texas.

Professional career

Oakland Raiders

2006
He recorded 110 tackles, 88 solo tackles, and 1 pass deflection in 2006.

2007
Howard's second season started off with an interception in each of his first 4 games, 2 of them which were returned for touchdowns. Since then he has also recorded a quarterback sack and 8 passes defensed. In only his second NFL season, Howard led the NFL in linebacker interceptions with 6 for 172 yards and 2 touchdowns. At the end of 2007, Howard had 95 tackles, 77 solo, 11 pass deflections, 6 interceptions, 1 sack, and 2 touchdowns.

2008

Howard recorded his first career forced fumble during a week 2 victory against the division rival Kansas City Chiefs. He recorded a second during a week 16 victory against the Houston Texans. At the end of the 2008 season, Thomas Howard had 97 tackles, 80 solo, 5 pass deflections, 1 interception, 1 sack, and 2 forced fumbles.

2009
While tallying a career low 79 tackles, 72 of which were solo, Howard still came away with a career-high 2 sacks. He finished the season with 79 tackles, 72 solo, 6 pass deflections, 2 sacks, and 1 forced fumble.

2010
The Oakland Raiders waived him after 12 games.

Cincinnati Bengals

2011
In the 2011 offseason, Thomas Howard signed a 2-year deal with the Bengals worth $6.5 million.

2012

On September 13, 2012, Joe Reedy of the Cincinnati Enquirer reported that the Bengals had placed linebacker Thomas Howard on injured reserve after tearing his ACL in practice.

Atlanta Falcons

2013
Howard was signed by the Atlanta Falcons on October 22, 2013, and subsequently released on November 12, 2013, having appeared in two games.

NFL statistics

Key
 GP: games played
 COMB: combined tackles
 TOTAL: total tackles
 AST: assisted tackles
 SACK: sacks
 FF: forced fumbles
 FR: fumble recoveries
 FR YDS: fumble return yards 
 INT: interceptions
 IR YDS: interception return yards
 AVG IR: average interception return
 LNG: longest interception return
 TD: interceptions returned for touchdown
 PD: passes defensed

Personal life

Family
Howard was born and raised in Lubbock, Texas and attended Lubbock Estacado High School. His father, Thomas Howard, Sr., also played in the NFL as a linebacker. Howard's cousin is singer Terry Ellis, best known as a member of En Vogue.

Philanthropy
In January 2010, Howard donated money to the Bay Area After-School All-Stars. The Bay Area After-School All-Stars is a program that provides free after school programming for underserved youth. The program currently serves 26 schools in San Jose and is looking to expand to more schools in the future. Students attend the program for four hours each day after school, doing their homework, creating art, and playing sports.

Howard launched the Thomas Howard Foundation in September 2009 to build partnerships and programs to enhance students' academic and athletic goals. The Foundation benefits youth who seek to excel in both education and organized sports activities.  The signature scholarships and programs of the Thomas Howard Foundation include:  The Annual Walk-On Scholarship; YFL Football Uniforms Scholarship Fund; the Are You Smarter than a 4th Grader program for school curriculum enhancement; and supporting the After-School All-Stars, providing programs that include academic support, enrichment opportunities, and health/fitness activities. Howard returned to his college town of El Paso for special programs honoring Walk-On athletes.

Death
On November 18, 2013, Howard was one of two people killed in an Oakland, California high-speed crash on Interstate Highway 880.

References

External links

Thomas Howard Official Website
Oakland Raiders bio

1983 births
2013 deaths
African-American players of American football
American football linebackers
Atlanta Falcons players
Cincinnati Bengals players
Oakland Raiders players
Players of American football from Texas
Road incident deaths in California
Sportspeople from Lubbock, Texas
UTEP Miners football players
20th-century African-American people
21st-century African-American sportspeople